The Bensen B-7 was a small rotor kite developed by Igor Bensen in the United States in the 1950s and marketed for home building. It was a refined to be a slightly larger version of the B-6, replacing the skids with a tricycle undercarriage, and adding a single large fin to the rear of the aircraft.

The B-7 was first towed aloft on 17 June 1955, and on 6 December that year, Bensen flew a motorized version designated the B-7M, a fully autonomous autogyro. The prototype B-7M crashed three days later with Bensen at the controls. Although the machine was soon repaired and in the air again, the incident set Bensen to work on further refinements to the design that would eventually lead to the B-8.

Variants
Data from: Jane's All the World's Aircraft 1958-59
B-7The basic gyro-glider
B-7B Gyro-boat A Gyro-glider mounted on a standard sailing dinghy hull.
B-7W Hydro-glider The B-7W "Hydroglider" was a gyrocopter designed to be towed from a motorboat at 10-20 mph. The B-7W was tested at Cypress Gardens Florida in 1955. It was marketed to be a sport vehicle, with practical uses in fish or submarine spotting. The floats were modified from a Republic Seabee.
B-7M A powered version of the B-7 with a Nelson H-59 4-cylinder 2-stroke horizontally-opposed engine driving a pusher propeller, mounted behind the pilot.

Specifications (B-7M)

References

Further reading

External links

 Bensen Aircraft Foundation
 Bensen Aircraft at Vortechonline.com

1950s United States sport aircraft
Rotor kites
Single-engined pusher autogyros
B-07
Homebuilt aircraft
Aircraft first flown in 1955